Piperales is an order of flowering plants (4,170 recognized species). It necessarily includes the family Piperaceae but other taxa have been included or disincluded variously over time.  Well-known plants which may be included in this order include black pepper, kava, pepper elder, lizard's tail, birthwort, and wild ginger.

Classification

APG system
In the APG IV system, of 2016, this order is placed in the clade magnoliids and is circumscribed as follows:

order Piperales 
 family Aristolochiaceae (including Asaraceae, Hydnoraceae and Lactoridaceae)
 family Piperaceae
 family Saururaceae

This is an expansion from the APG system, of 1998, which used the same placement (in the magnoliids) but used this circumscription: 
 order Piperales''
 family Aristolochiaceae
 family Lactoridaceae
 family Piperaceae
 family Saururaceae

Earlier systems
The Cronquist system, of 1981, placed the order in the subclass Magnoliidae of class Magnoliopsida [=dicotyledons] and used this circumscription: 
 order Piperales
 family Chloranthaceae
 family Piperaceae
 family Saururaceae

The Engler system, in its update of 1964, placed the order in subclassis Archichlamydeae in class Dicotyledoneae [=dicotyledons] and used this circumscription: 
 order Piperales
 family Chloranthaceae
 family Lactoridaceae
 family Piperaceae
 family Saururaceae

The Wettstein system, latest version published in 1935, assigned the order to the Monochlamydeae in subclass Choripetalae of class Dicotyledones. It used the circumscription:
 order Piperales
 family Piperaceae

References

	

 
Angiosperm orders